Sofla Rural District may refer to:
 Sofla Rural District (Fars Province)
 Sofla Rural District (Isfahan Province)